Sir Edward Denny (1605 – 1646) was an Anglo-Irish politician.

Denny was the son of Sir Edward Denny (1584–1619) and Elizabeth Forest. He was High Sheriff of Kerry in 1634 and Member of Parliament for Kerry in the Irish House of Commons from 1639 until his death. Between 1638 and 1641 he was Constable of Castle Maine. In the Irish Rebellion of 1641, his seat at Tralee Castle was attacked and burnt by Irish rebels.

He married Ruth Roper, daughter of Thomas Roper, 1st Viscount Baltinglass. He was succeeded in his estate by his son, Arthur Denny.

References

1605 births
1646 deaths
17th-century Anglo-Irish people
High Sheriffs of Kerry
Irish MPs 1639–1649
Members of the Parliament of Ireland (pre-1801) for County Kerry constituencies
People of the Irish Confederate Wars